RAS syndrome (where "RAS" stands for "redundant acronym syndrome", making the phrase "RAS syndrome" homological) is the redundant use of one or more of the words that make up an acronym (or other initialism) in conjunction with the abbreviated form. This means, in effect, repeating one or more words from the acronym. Three common examples are "PIN number" / "VIN number" (the "N" in PIN and VIN stands for "number") and "ATM machine" (the "M" in ATM stands for "machine"). The term RAS syndrome was coined in 2001 in a light-hearted column in New Scientist.  

Many style guides advise against usage of these redundant acronyms in formal contexts, but they are widely used in colloquial speech.

Examples 

Examples of RAS phrases include:
 DC Comics (Detective Comics Comics)
 HIV virus (human immunodeficiency virus virus)
 LCD display (liquid crystal display display)
 UPC code (universal product code code)

Reasons for use 
Although there are many instances in editing where removal of redundancy improves clarity, the pure-logic ideal of zero redundancy is seldom maintained in human languages. Bill Bryson says, "Not all repetition is bad. It can be used for effect ..., or for clarity, or in deference to idiom. 'OPEC countries', 'SALT talks' and 'HIV virus' are all technically redundant because the second word is already contained in the preceding abbreviation, but only the ultra-finicky would deplore them. Similarly, in 'Wipe that smile off your face' the last two words are tautological—there is no other place a smile could be—but the sentence would not stand without them."

A limited amount of redundancy can improve the effectiveness of communication, either for the whole readership or at least to offer help to those readers who need it. A phonetic example of that principle is the need for spelling alphabets in radiotelephony. Some instances of RAS syndrome can be viewed as syntactic examples of the principle. The redundancy may help the listener by providing context and decreasing the "alphabet soup quotient" (the cryptic overabundance of abbreviations and acronyms) of the communication.

Acronyms and initialisms from foreign languages are often treated as unanalyzed morphemes when they are not translated.  For example, in French, "le protocole IP" (the Internet Protocol protocol) is often used, and in English "please RSVP" (roughly "please respond please") is very common. This occurs for the same linguistic reasons that cause many toponyms to be tautological. The tautology is not parsed by the mind in most instances of real-world use (in many cases because the foreign word's meaning is not known anyway; in others simply because the usage is idiomatic).

Non-examples 
Sometimes the presence of repeated words does not create a redundant phrase. For example, "laser (light amplification by stimulated emission of radiation) light" is light produced by a light amplification process.  Similarly, "OPEC countries" are two or more member states of the Organization of the Petroleum Exporting Countries, whereas "OPEC" by itself denotes the overall organization.

See also 

 Autological word
 Bilingual tautological expressions
 List of tautological place names
 Recursive acronym
 Tautology (rhetoric)

References

External links 
 

Acronyms
Linguistic morphology
Rhetoric
Semantics
Syntax
Word play

de:Akronym#Redundantes Akronym